Guiyuan Community is a residential community in Shiqi Subdistrict, Zhongshan, Guangdong, China. Guiyuan Community occupies part of Zhongshan's old city.

History 
The current iteration of Guiyuan Community was established in November 2004 as a merger between three now-defunct residential communities.

Education 
Guiyuan Community has three major schools: Zhongshan Huaqiao Middle School, Shiqi District Experimental Primary School, and Shiqi District East Gate Primary School.

Economy 
As of 2019, the residential community is home to three markets and two department stores.

References 

Communities of China
Zhongshan